Get On Up: The James Brown Story (Original Motion Picture Soundtrack) is the soundtrack to the 2014 film of the same name directed by Tate Taylor, based on the life of singer James Brown, and is played by Chadwick Boseman in the film. The album featured 20 songs which also include live renditions of tracks performed by Brown in concert tours but remained unreleased to the public, and five of the tunes which are newly produced and arranged by the record production duo Underdogs. The music was positively received by critics and nominated for Grammy Award for Best Compilation Soundtrack for Visual Media.

Track listing 
All tracks are written and performed by James Brown.

Chart performance

Awards

References 

2014 soundtrack albums
James Brown albums
Universal Music Enterprises albums